Oedoncus taenipalpis is a species of tephritid or fruit flies in the genus Oedoncus of the family Tephritidae.

Distribution
Tanzania, Malawi, Zimbabwe, Mozambique, South Africa.

References

Tephritinae
Insects described in 1924
Diptera of Africa
Taxa named by Paul Gustav Eduard Speiser